TipsArena Linz (formerly Linzer Sporthalle and Intersport Arena) is an indoor sports arena, located in Linz, Austria. The capacity of the arena is 6,000 people for tennis and football events, and 2,500 for athletics. The arena opened in September 1974.

It is the home of the Generali Ladies Linz, a WTA Tour tennis tournament.

See also
Intersport
 List of tennis stadiums by capacity

External links
Official website

Indoor arenas in Austria
Tennis venues in Austria
Handball venues in Austria
Buildings and structures in Linz
Sports venues in Upper Austria